An Angel in Australia is a 2002 novel by Thomas Keneally. Set in Australia during World War II, it follows the life of a young Catholic priest, Father Frank Darragh, in 1940s Sydney.

Publication history
An Angel in Australia, 2002, Australia, Doubleday Australia 
The Office of Innocence, 2002, England, Sceptre 
Office of Innocence, 2003, USA, Nan A. Talese/Doubleday

Reception
A review in the Australian Book Review called it "an oxymoronic book — a subdued novel", and further "Its accent is meditative, its notes of sadness leavened by the resilient self-regard of the characters he [Keneally] has mustered.".

An Angel in Australia has also been reviewed by The Sydney Morning Herald, and The New York Times.

Awards and nominations
 International Dublin Literary Award: nominated 2004
 Miles Franklin Award: shortlisted 2003

References

Novels by Thomas Keneally
Novels set during World War II
2002 Australian novels
Australian historical novels
Novels set in Australia
Doubleday (publisher) books